Myxas glutinosa (glutinous snail) is a species of small air-breathing freshwater snail, an aquatic gastropod mollusc in the family Lymnaeidae, the pond snails.

Anatomy 

This snail is unusual in that it extends its almost transparent mantle to completely cover the shell when it is in motion, giving the very small animal a glass-like appearance. It also makes the animal sticky to the touch, hence its common name.

Shell Description
The shell is 13 to 16 mm in height and 11 mm to 15 mm in width in the adult. The upper whorls are almost flat so that the shell has a short blunt spire, the last whorl is inflated and predominating. The aperture is more than 90% of the shell height. The umbilicus is closed. The shell colour is brown or green, extremely thin and very transparent and shiny.

Distribution
This species is European: it is now rare in western Europe, and even rarer in eastern Europe.

 British Isles - listed in List of endangered species in the British Isles
 This species is fully protected in the United Kingdom under the Wildlife and Countryside Act 1981 since 1981.
 Great Britain - in one locality in Wales
 Ireland - extinct in Northern Ireland, still common in the Royal Canal and Grand Canal in central Ireland
 Czech Republic - extinct in Bohemia
 Germany - critically endangered (vom Aussterben bedroht)
 Netherlands
 Poland

According to the IUCN red list it is also native to Austria, Belarus, Belgium, Estonia, Finland, Germany, Kazakhstan, Latvia, Lithuania, Moldova, Norway, Russian Federation, Sweden and Ukraine.

Habitat
This species requires pollution-free, extremely clear, calm water, in calcium-rich canals, streams and lakes.

It is rapidly declining or already extinct in many European countries, because of the loss of good habitat.

References

Further reading 
 Green W. A. (1901). "Amphipeplea (Lymnaea) glutinosa in the River Bann". Irish Naturalist 10: 132.
 Vinarski M. V., Grebennikov M. E. & Shishkoedova O. S. (2013). "Past and present distribution of Myxas glutinosa (O.F. Müller, 1774) in the waterbodies of the Urals and Siberia". Journal of Limnology 72(2): 336–342. .
 Welch R. J. (1900). "Amphipeplea glutinosa Müller, in Ireland". Irish Naturalist 9: 48.

External links
Myxas glutinosa at Animalbase taxonomy,short description, distribution, biology,status (threats), images

Lymnaeidae
Gastropods described in 1774
Taxa named by Otto Friedrich Müller